In Antiquity, Pelodes or Palodes was a site that cannot be identified with any certainty. One obscure Palodes was a minor port site on the eastern side of the Bosporus, about halfway up, a little south of Amycus.

A reference to another  Palodes is in Plutarch's De defectu oraculorum ("Obsolescence of Oracles") of which a common reading is that the Greek god Pan is dead. During the reign of Tiberius (AD 14-37), Plutarch records, the news of Pan's death came to one Thamus, a sailor on his way to Italy by way of the islands of Paxi. A divine voice hailed him across the salt water, "Thamus, are you there? When you reach  Palodes, take care to proclaim that the great god Pan is dead." Which Thamus did, and the news was greeted from shore with groans and laments. But see Pan (mythology).

In Plutarch's context, Epitherses was sailing up the western coast of Greece, presumably intending to cross to Italy once he reached Corfu, following a standard Roman sea-route between Italy and Greece. The ship had already drifted from the Echinades (near Ithaca) up to Paxi. Strabo (7.7.5) mentions  "the mouth of the so-called Pelodes Limen as the location of Buthrotum (modern Butrint in southern Albania, opposite the northern end of Corfu.

Notes

References
"Where or what was Palodes?"

Roman towns and cities in Turkey
Former populated places in Turkey